The 2000 Samoa National League, or also known as the Upolo First Division, was the 12th edition of the Samoa National League, the top league of the Football Federation Samoa. Titavi FC won their first title.

Standings
Known results from source:

References

Samoa National League seasons
Samoa
football